Georges El Fakhri from the Massachusetts General Hospital / Harvard Medical School, Boston, MA was named Fellow of the Institute of Electrical and Electronics Engineers (IEEE) in 2016 for contributions to biological imaging.

References 

Fellow Members of the IEEE
Living people
Harvard Medical School faculty
21st-century American engineers
Year of birth missing (living people)
American electrical engineers